Al Rogers (March 1, 1909 – December 5, 1984) was an American race car driver from Pekin, Illinois. He won the Pikes Peak International Hill Climb four times between 1947 and 1954, when he was part of the AAA Championship Car. Rogers has a total of five victories, the first being obtained before World War II, in 1940. He died on December 5, 1984 in Colorado Springs, Colorado.

Complete AAA Championship Car results
(key) (Races in bold indicate pole position)

References

1909 births
1984 deaths
Racing drivers from Illinois
People from Pekin, Illinois
AAA Championship Car drivers

Carrera Panamericana drivers